Darren & Brose is an Australian late night television comedy programme hosted by Darren Chau and Brose Avard. The show premiered on Thursday 2 July 2015 at 11pm on Network Ten's one.

Episodes

References

External links
 
 

10 Bold original programming
Australian comedy television series
Australian television talk shows
Australian variety television shows
Television shows set in Melbourne
2015 Australian television series debuts
English-language television shows